Panna State was a princely state of colonial India, located in modern Panna district of Madhya Pradesh.

The state of Panna belonged to the Bundelkhand Agency and covered an area of, 6724 km2 with 1,008 villages within its borders in 1901. It took its name from the chief town in the area, Panna, which was the capital of the state.

History
A predecessor state was founded by one of the Raj Gond chiefs of the area around 1450.
Almost three centuries later Panna was the capital chosen by a leader Chhatar Sal, the founder of Panna State, after leading a revolt against the Mughal Empire. He established an alliance with the  Maratha Peshwa and made Panna his capital. After conquering Mahoba in 1680 Chhatar Sal extended his rule over most of Bundelkhand. Upon his death in 1731, his kingdom was divided among his sons, with one-third of the kingdom going to his son-in-law, the Peshwa Baji Rao I.

The Kingdom of Panna went to Harde Sah, the eldest son of Chhatar Sal. In the early 19th century, Panna became a princely state of British India, and gained control of the states of Nagod and Sohawal. Raja Nirpat Singh assisted the British in the Revolt of 1857, and the British rewarded him with the title Maharaja.

Maharaja Madho Singh was deposed by the Viceroy in April 1902, after a commission found him guilty of poisoning his uncle, Rao Raja Khuman Singh, the previous year.

Maharaja Mahendra Yadvendra Singh acceded to the Government of India on 1 January 1950, and the kingdom became Panna District of the new Indian state of Vindhya Pradesh. Vindhya Pradesh was merged into Madhya Pradesh on 1 November 1956.

Rulers
The rulers of the state were entitled to an 11-gun salute by the British authorities.

Rajas
1675 - 1731                Raja Chhatrasal
1731 - 1739                Hardesah Singh                     (d. 1739) 
1739 - 1752                Sabha Singh                        (d. 1752) 
1752 - 1758                Aman Singh                         (d. 1758) 
1758 - 1777                Hindupat Singh                     (d. 1777) 
1777 - 1779                Anirudh Singh                      (d. 1779) 
1779 - 1785                interregnum 
1785 - 1798                Dhokal Singh 
1798 - 1834                Kishor Singh                       (d. 1834) 
1834 - 1849                Harbans Rai 
1849 - 1869                Nirpat Singh                       (d. 1870)

Maharajas
1869 - Jun 1870            Nirpat Singh                       (s.a.)  
 9 Jun 1870 - 1893         Rudra Pratap Singh                 (b. 1848 - d. 1893) (from 1 Jan 1876, Sir Rudra Pratap Singh)
1893 -  9 Mar 1898         Lokpal Singh                       (d. 1898)
 9 Mar 1898 – 22 Apr 1902  Madho Singh                        (d. af.1925)
 20 Jun 1902 – 15 Aug 1947  Yadvendra Singh Judeo (b. 1893 - d. 1963)

Titular Maharajas
 1947 - 1963: Yadvendra Singh Judeo
 1963 - 1971: Narendra Singh Judeo

After abolition of all royal titles and privy purse in 1971.

 1971 - 1998: Narendra Singh Judeo
 1998 - 2009: Manvendra Singh Judeo
 2009 – 2023: Raghavendra Singh  Judeo

See also
Chaube Jagirs
Jaitpur State
Nagod State
Political integration of India
Bijawar-Panna Plateau
Bundela

References

External links

 

Princely states of Bundelkhand
Panna district
Rajputs
Panna, India
1731 establishments in India
1950 disestablishments in India